Hermes of Dalmatia is numbered among the Seventy Disciples. He was bishop in Dalmatia.

Life
His feast days are celebrated on April 8 with his fellow martyrs, and on January 4 among the Seventy.

(There is another Apostle of the Seventy by the name of Hermas, who was bishop in the Thracian city of Philippopolis).

Hymns
Troparion (Tone 1)  

Let us praise in hymns the six–fold choir of Apostles:
Herodion and Agabus,
Rufus, Asyncritus, Phlegon and holy Hermes.
They ever entreat the Trinity for our souls!

Kontakion (Tone 2)

You became the disciples of Christ
And all-holy Apostles,
O glorious Herodion, Agabus and Rufus,
Asyncritus, Phlegon and Hermes.
Ever entreat the Lord
To grant forgiveness of transgressions
To us who sing your praises.

Kontakion (Tone 4)

Like stars, O holy Apostles,
You illumine the way of the faithful with the light of the Holy Spirit.
You dispel the darkness of error as you gaze on God the Word!

References

Sources 
St. Nikolai Velimirovic, The Prologue from Ohrid

External links
Apostle Hermes of the Seventy, January 4 (OCA)
Agavos, Rouphos, Asynkritos, Phlegon, Herodion, & Hermes of the 70 Apostles (GOARCH)

Ancient Roman saints
1st-century bishops
Seventy disciples
1st-century Christian martyrs
Christian saints from the New Testament
Year of birth unknown
Croatian Roman Catholic saints
Greek Roman Catholic saints